David Horspool (born January 7, 1971) is a historian and sport editor of The Times Literary Supplement.

Writing
A scholar at Eton and Christ Church, Oxford, he writes for the Sunday Times, The Guardian, the Telegraph and The New York Times.

Books
His first book, Why Alfred Burned the Cakes: A King and His 1100-year Afterlife, was a scholarly yet popular history of the reign of King Alfred. His next book, published in August 2009, is The English Rebel: One Thousand Years of Trouble-making from the Normans to the Nineties, a history of rebellion from Magna Carta to Arthur Scargill. David collaborated with Colin Firth and Anthony Arnove to produce the book The People's Speak, published by Canongate Books in August 2013.

References

Living people
1971 births
English male journalists